Andy Haase (born July 10, 1974) is a former American football tight end. He played for the New York Giants in 1998.

References

1974 births
Living people
American football tight ends
Northern Colorado Bears football players
New York Giants players